Pleurotomella vagans is an extinct species of sea snail, a marine gastropod mollusk in the family Raphitomidae.

Description

Distribution
Fossils of this marine species were found in Oligocene strata in Île-de-France, France

References

 Koch, F. E. & Wiechmann, C. M. 1872: Die Mollusken-Fauna des Sternberger Gesteins in Meklenburg. — Archiv des Vereins der
Freunde der Naturgeschichte in Mecklenburg 25, 5–128
 Lozouet (P.) & Maestrati (P.), 2012 Le contenu paléontologique. Mollusques. In : Lozouet (P.) Stratotype stampien, p. 239-297

vagans
Gastropods described in 1872